Dawdon is a former pit community to the south of Seaham, County Durham, England. An area of the beach near Dawdon (known locally as "the Blast", a former waste coal dumping site) was used in the opening scenes of the science fiction film Alien 3.

History 
The township of Dawdon (commonly spelled Dawden on old records and maps) consisted of an area of 1,088 acres  between the Durham coast and the townships of Seaham, Dalton-le-Dale and Cold Hesledon. Seaham Harbour was built in the township. The port and town grew during the 19th century, and in 1894 the township was given urban district status, under the name Seaham Harbour. In 1937 the parishes of Dawdon and Seaham were merged into the new Seaham urban district.

"The population in 1801 was 22; in 1811, 27; in 1821, 35; in 1831, in consequence of the construction of a new harbour, it had increased to 1022; in 1841, 2017; in 1851, 3538; in 1861, 6137; in 1871, 7132; in 1881, 7714; and in 1891, 9044."

Climate 

Like the rest of the United Kingdom, Dawdon has a temperate climate. The area sees on average 1374.6 hours of sunshine per year, compared with a national average of 1125.0 hours. There is frost on 52 days compared with a national average of 55.6 days.

The table below gives the average temperature and rainfall figures taken between 1971 and 2000 at the Met Office weather station in Durham:

Economy 
This is a chart of trend of regional gross value added of County Durham at current basic prices published (pp. 240–253) by Office for National Statistics with figures in millions of British Pounds Sterling.

St Hild and St Helen's Church 

The church of St Hild and St Helen's - known as the Pitman's Cathedral - was built by donations from local pitmen and consecrated on 10 February 1912.

A Grand Bazaar, charity events and a £2,000 donation from the Marquess of Londonderry helped pay for the building and hundreds of pitmen mingled with ministers and civic dignitaries for the grand unveiling.

"The milestone date began with Holy Communion, held for the last time in the former Cottages School," the late Tom McNee recorded in a history of the church.

"After lunch at Seaham Hall, the Marquess of Londonderry and his distinguished party of 100 joined more than 500 parishioners for the ceremony."

In the 1860s, the part of Seaham Harbour which would become Dawdon consisted of three isolated communities. The first had grown around the bottleworks, the second was next to a chemical works, and the third was at Swinebank – housing Londonderry's engine and wagon works staff.

His decision to sink a new colliery at Dawdon in 1899 was to change the face of the area forever. As work on the pit progressed, so the three little hamlets were swallowed up by rows of houses, shops and pubs.

Plans for a new church followed, with the Marchioness of Londonderry laying the foundation stone in September 1910. Walter Bolland, the senior curate, took church services in the nearby Cottages Schoolroom while the work progressed.

Just two years later, the new £6,500 St Hild and St Helen's was finished, seating up to 700 worshippers in comfort. "Uniquely, it was built from north to south, rather than east to west, because of an unusual fault in the rock formation under the church," Mr McNee recorded.

The interior "was beautified by numerous and costly gifts", many from Marchioness Theresa, including a fine organ. But the high altar was a particular highlight, decorated with the face of St Hild and carved as a likeness to Theresa.

Church organisations soon flourished, including a successful choir, which opera singer Thomas Allen once belonged to. Decades later, however, the vicarage and church came under attack from Hitler's Luftwaffe during World War II .

As explosives dropped in nearby streets, the vicar, James Duncan, sought refuge under the stairs of the vicarage.
Just minutes later, two bombs exploded next to the house, bringing down ceilings and ripping doors from hinges.

A large hole was also blown in the west wall of the Grade II-listed church and almost all the stained-glass windows were shattered. Confident the community would be able to raise the £1,000 needed for repairs, the Rev Duncan authorised work to begin.

His faith in the people of Dawdon was soon rewarded as, just nine months later, the target was reached. However, the church again faced an uncertain future, eventually closing due to dwindling congregation numbers.

While St Hild and St Helen Church was in the process of closing down the local A.O.G. Pentecostal church in the town, The Lighthouse Christian Centre came forward with an offer to buy the building.  The Church of England agreed to sell for a nominal sum on condition that it would continue to be used as a Christian church.

The keys were handed over to the newly named "St Hild and St Helen Christian Fellowship” in October 2008.  A Thanksgiving Service was held in the same month where the congregation was joined by the "Churches Together" group of Seaham Christian churches.

It was decided  to refurbish and update the building so that it would be better suited to serve the community.  Rooms were created to enable a wide range of services to fulfil the aim of becoming a church in the community for the community.

Work commenced in January 2009 and lasted 5 months.  The church Centenary was celebrated in November 2012, consisting of an "Open Day" featuring a "Victorian Christmas Fayre", "Wedding Fashion Show" and a "Songs of Praise" service.

Since then the church has continued and extended its programme of services to the community, reaching out to all ages in Dawdon and beyond.

The programme now consists of Toddlers Groups, a Food Bank, Lunch Club, C.A.P. Debt Centre, Craft Group, Healthy Eating on a Budget Courses, Youth Group, funeral services and the free wedding service called "Marriage Matters" which has attracted more than 60 weddings so far.

The "Pitman's Cathedral" lives on, and in fact the pastor since it changed hands, Mr  David Taylor, is an ex-pitman himself.

St Hild and St Helen Christian Fellowship is a Charity registered in England No. 1052543.

Dawdon Colliery 

The decision to create a new pit at Dawdon was taken by the Marquess of Londonderry in the late 19th century, due to problems at his collieries in nearby Seaham. As Seaham Colliery's workings pushed out to the south-east, it became increasing expensive to mine the reserves from the old pit's shafts.

It was therefore decided to sink new shafts in the rocky coastal area of Noses Point, close to the ancient settlement of Dawdon. Sinking work began in March 1900, but soon ran into problems. Water-bearing rocks proved difficult to excavate, which meant freezing techniques had to be used.
The colliery finally opened for production in October 1907. Dawdon reached the peak of its employment in 1925, when 3862 men and boys helped to produce over one million tonnes of coal annually.

The men of Dawdon Colliery were forced into several industrial disputes with those who wanted to maintain their profits, but escaped the major tragedies suffered by pits at Seaham and Easington Colliery. Many of Dawdon's men did die within its depths, but usually from individual accidents.

Dawdon was a major coal producer for the Londonderry family throughout their ownership, and was later a jewel in the crown for the National Coal Board too. Under nationalisation, the government claimed that the mines belonged to the miners. This proved to be a nonsense as later industrial disputes proved. However, as the mining industry went into decline in the 1980s, Dawdon suffered too. The colliery was eventually closed in July 1991.

Home to a rich industrial past relating closely with its near neighbour Seaham, Dawdon was home to the Seaham Harbour Blast Furnace, in Dawdon Field Dene. The original Seaham Bottle Works was situated here in 1855. The blast furnaces closed in 1865 but were soon replaced by the Chemical Works.

In 1920 the new colliery, Dawdon, employed 3,300 workers and produced over 1 million tons of coal per year outstripping its local competitors. The ironworks and colliery sites have recently been reclaimed and a modern industrial estate launching Dawdon into the 21st century.

Timeline 
1900 March - started sinking of shafts.

1907 October - completed sinking of shafts. 5 October – colliery opened.

1910 Welfare Hall opened. Twenty streets of colliery houses built.

1912 Church of St Hild and St Helen, known as "The Pitmen’s Cathedral" erected by the Londonderry family.

1914 Low Main and Hutton seams being worked.

1921 Low Main, Maudlin, Hutton and Main coal seams being worked.

1921 8 August – Triple Alliance of Miners, Railwaymen and Transport Workers started.
30 June – strike called off plunging Durham into a trade depression that left 20% of miners and over 100 collieries idle.

1925 Employment peaks at 3862

1926 May – General Strike started.
November – Durham Miners returned to work having held out for 7 months.

1927 12 Aged Miners' cottages built in Dawdon.

1929 2 March – Dawdon Miners locked out in dispute over piece work rates.
4 November – Dawdon Miners reluctantly return to work.

1930 1000 Dawdon miners laid off. Seaham Colliery closed for 2 years to ensure production at Londonderry's new Vane Tempest Colliery.

1930s Dawdon Welfare Park completed.

1935 Low Main, Maudlin, Hutton and Main coal seams being worked.

1940 15 August – Dawdon bombed by Luftwaffe. 12 dead, 119 people homeless, 5 houses destroyed, Dawdon Church, Vicarage and 230 houses damaged.

1947 Nationalisation of Coal Industry. 2556 miners employed at Dawdon. 647,555 tonnes of coal produced.

1950 Low Main, Maudlin, Hutton and Main coal seams being worked.

1950s Steam winders replaced by electric Koepe winders.

1960 2348 miners employed. Low Main, Maudlin, Hutton, Main Coal and High Main (Dawdon's highest producing seam) seams being worked.

1969 13 October – Dawdon on strike for 3 days in support of Yorkshire Miners demanding shorter shifts for surface workers.

1972 High Main and Yard Seams being worked.
8 January – National Strike begins demanding substantial wage rise.
28 February – successful conclusion to National Strike.

1974 9 February – 6-week strike began. Again for improved wages and conditions.

1975 High Main and Yard seams being worked.

1980 2106 miners employed. High Main, Yard and Main coal seams being worked.

1984 14 March - All Durham collieries join national strike against the threat of pit closures by the Conservative government

1985 3 March – National Strike over without agreement. Dawdon Miners returned to work behind their banner and promptly marched back out as a gesture of defiance. Only 133 men had returned to work early.
High Main, Yard, Main Coal and "C" seams being worked.
2186 miners employed.

1986 E90 Face lost to water.

1988 1700 miners employed.
One million tons of coal abandoned for safety reasons in the "G" seam.

1990 1592 miners employed.
High Main, Yard, Main Coal and "C" seams being worked.

1991 27 July – Dawdon Colliery closed.

Pitmen and boys who lost their lives at Dawdon Colliery 
Attwood, George: 34, on 6 September 1907, after electric lamp cable broke and fell on him.
Bacon, Edward: 51, on 6 June 1963.
Barden, James: 34, on 17 March 1930.
Baron, Joseph: 32, on 2 November 1968.
Black, JA: 27, on 21 December 1941.
Boad, G: 60, on 25 January 1943.
Bolton, J: 49, on 19 March 1952.
Briggs, Robert: 30, on 11 September 1907.
Brown, F: 63, on 9 April 1945.
Bryan, John: 20, on 27 May 1914, after rock fall.
Buckley, J: 16, on 5 January 1940.
Carr, S: 62, on 23 March 1945.
Casey, Randolph: 44, on 29 July 1959.
Close, Francis: 42, on 27 September 1961.
Clyde, George: 44, on 14 October 1931.
Coates, Thomas: 14, on 22 May 1925.
Crake, R: 24, February 1937.
Davis, W: 55, on 2 January 1948.
Davison, William: 24, on 23 August 1923.
Dodds, Charles: 31, on 12 March 1929.
Douglas, Thomas: 26, on 23 September 1901, scaffolding broke, fell into sump and drowned.
Duck, Frederick: 15, on 16 November 1910, crushed by a tub.
Dunn, Henry: 27, on 6 September 1907, electric lamp cable broke and fell on him.
Edminson, M: 60, on 23 February 1922.
Emery, William: 26, on 6 November 1929.
Evans, George: 63, on 29 April 1934.
Field, John: 51, on 21 March 1908, fell down shaft.
Fleury, James: 17, on 21 August 1925.
Foster, Ralph: 14, on 18 February 1914.
Freeman, Thomas: 37, on 6 June 1963.
Geddes, W: 57, on 6 May 1927.
Glithro, Thomas: 25, on 11 September 1907, thrown from a cradle to the bottom of the pit.
Greenwood, George: 44, on 30 November 1910, buried by stones.
Grieves, Ralph: on 25 April 1960.
Hamilton, Charles: 19, on 28 March 1926, crushed by a tub.
Hasson, Frederick: 20, on 19 May 1927.
Hastings, Samuel: 19, on 27 February 1910.
Hepworth, Robert: 14, on 20 July 1917.
Hockings, W: 15, on 25 July 1929, run over.
Hughes, Richard: 14, on 14 April 1911, crushed.
Hull, James: on 25 December 1924, crushed.
Jones, S: 34, on 18 April 1944.
Judd, T: 43, on 29 December 1945.
Kennedy, Robert: 18, on 2 October 1914, crushed.
Langley, Norman: June 1967, fell 60 ft.
Lawrence, John: 19, on 4 June 1913, crushed.
Little, J: 21, on 4 July 1929, crushed in accident.
Maratty, J: 45, on 25 October 1945.
Maratty, Patrick: 18, on 27 December, crushed.
Marsh, Ed John: 14, on 26 April 1923.
McDonald, Alexander: 46, on 14 March 1933.
McDonough, Bernard: 14, on 21 January 1926.
Mead, William: 36, on 15 October 1954.
Muir, JH: 15, on 28 December 1942.
Murphy, John: 29, on 13 February 1925.
Musgrove, Frank Currie: 17, on 25 June 1931.
Nixon, T: 51, on 1 November 1943.
Nugent, H: 15, on 29 July 1928.
Olley, Edward: 39, December 1955.
Owen, Ralph: 41, on 23 May 1934.
Phelan, John: 19, on 6 November 1929.
Pigg, F: 17, on 9 December 1930, crushed.
Potts, George: 22, 27 March 1926.
Preston, John: 17, on 17 December 1912, binding wheel accident.
Robinson, Daniel: 17, on 23 July 1926.
Robson, Emmerson: 38, on 30 September 1930.
Rodgers, William W: 14, on 10 December 1923.
Rogan, Vincent: on 28 May 1925, roof fall.
Rogerson, Frederick: 11, on 17 June 1916.
Rudkin, J: 59, on 27 December 1943.
Schneider, George: 36, on 11 August 1903.
Shepherd, Walter: 14, on 23 February 1923.
Simpson, Joseph: 49, on 5 September 1908.
Smith, George: 23, on 11 September 1907.
Snaith, Alfred: 31, on 25 November 1955.
Spence, Randolph: Died 1960.
Tempest, W: 51, on 21 August 1948.
Thirlwell, William: 44, on 1 September 1922.
Turns, David Dick Brown: 50, on 19 September 1923.
Walker, W: 38, on 16 January 1931.
Walters, Edward: 45, on 10 March 1926.
Waugh, Charles: 38, on 26 April 1927.
Wheatman, Ralph: 24, on 11 February 1937.
Williams, John: 40, on 27 July 1910, crushed.
Williams, Silas: 53, on 27 May 1914.

See also 
 History of County Durham
 Durham
 Seaham
 Durham Miners' Gala
 Sunderland
 Murton, County Durham

References

External links 
 News stories on Dawdon: 
 A thousand old photos of Seaham, Dawdon and Murton: 
 Dawdon Colliery Remembered

Villages in County Durham
Populated coastal places in County Durham